Organization & Method College or (O&M College) is a university in Santo Domingo in the Dominican Republic. It was founded in 1966 by José Rafael Abinader. It has campus in other cities as well, Santiago de los Caballeros, La Romana, San José de Ocoa, San Felipe de Puerto Plata, Moca, Santo Domingo Este.

External links
 Official Page

Universities in the Dominican Republic
Education in Santo Domingo